The title-transfer theory of contract (TTToC) is a legal interpretation of contracts developed by economist Murray Rothbard and jurist Williamson Evers. The theory interprets all contractual obligations in terms of property rights, viewing a contract as a bundle of title transfers. According to Randy Barnett, the TTToC stands in opposition to most mainstream contract theories which view contractual obligations as the result of a binding promise. Proponents of the approach often claim it is superior on grounds of both consistency and ethical considerations. The TTToC is often supported by libertarians.

Interpretation of contracts

The TTToC considers a contract to be a transfer of property titles between parties to the contract. Title transfers can be conditional, implying a title transfer is to take effect only if a specified condition is met, as well as future oriented implying a title transfer is to take effect at a specified future point in time. For example, in a loan contract the lender transfers title to the principal to the borrower, and the borrower transfers to the lender a future title to the amount of the principal plus the interest. When the loan matures the transfer of title from borrower to lender takes effect, and the lender is entitled to obtain the money, which now belongs to him. It is important to mention the lender is entitled to obtain the money only when that money exists and is in the possession of the borrower. Another example is a service provision contract in which the service consumer transfers a future title of money to a service provider on the condition that a certain act of service is performed. If the service is not provided the condition of the transfer is not met and the conditional title transfer of money does not take effect. Contracts can be agreed upon either by explicit verbal agreement (as is the case with formal written contracts) or by implicit representation of agreement (as is the case when a restaurant order is placed by a passerby).

Fraud
Under the TTToC breach of contract is only what can be interpreted as an act of theft. For example, if a specified condition for a conditional title transfer from party A to party B is not met, yet party B still captures possession of the property they are not entitled to, they have committed theft, whether the possession was taken by force, or by false representation of fact creating the impression the transfer conditions has been met.

If a service provider has failed to perform an act of service, he has not committed theft. In such cases provisions should be made in advance for the non-breaching party to be entitled to compensation, in the condition of a failure to provide the agreed upon service.

Implications
Since the TTToC is based on property rights, it is compatible with the non-aggression principle. According to the proponents of the theory, the TTToC ensures ownership of every owned good is well defined at any point in time. Contracts regarding unalienable property titles are not binding. Some argue that since ownership of one's body is unalienable, voluntary slavery contracts are not binding under the TTToC.  Promises that are not made with the intention of being legally binding are also non-enforceable under the TTToC.

See also
 Freedom of contract
 Bundle of rights
 Pacta sunt servanda

References

External links
 
 

Contract law
Libertarian theory
Theories of law
Classical liberalism
Anarcho-capitalism
Economic ideologies